Cnaemidophorus horribilis is a moth of the family Pterophoridae. It is known from Madagascar.

References

Platyptiliini
Moths described in 1996
Moths of Madagascar
Plume moths of Africa